Moerai is a village on the island of Rurutu, in French Polynesia. According to the 2017 census, it had grown to a population 1,101 people.

References

Populated places in French Polynesia